Nuestra Belleza Puebla 2011, was held at the Complejo Cultural Universitario in Cholula, Puebla on July 13, 2011. At the conclusion of the final night of competition Aranza Barbosa of Tehuacán was crowned the winner. Barbosa was crowned by outgoing Nuestra Belleza Puebla titleholder Ana Laura Gallardo. Eight contestants competed for the title.

Results

Placements

Special Awards

Judges
Luis de Llano Stevens - TV Producer
Karla Jiménez - Nuestra Belleza Mundo México 2005
Rosa María Ojeda - Nuestra Belleza México 2006
Tere Guzman
Paola Huerta
Marco Samaniego - Photographer
Paty Brogeras - Regional Coordinator of Nuestra Belleza México
José Medel Bello

Background Music
Matute Band

Contestants

References

External links
Official Website

Puebla, 2011
Nuestra Belleza, 2011
2011 in Mexico